Gastone Pescucci (21 July 1926 – 28 October 1999) was an Italian  actor and voice actor.

Life and career 
Born in Certaldo, Pescucci was mainly active on stage, where he alternated between classics and modern works. He was also active on television and in films, being mainly cast in humorous roles.

Selected filmography 
 The Two Crusaders (1968)
 Oh, Grandmother's Dead (1969)
 Double Face (1969) 
 Between Miracles (1971)
 Boccaccio (1972)
 A forza di sberle (1974)
 Scandal in the Family (1975)
 Substitute Teacher (1975)
 At Last, at Last (1975)
 Confessions of a Lady Cop (1976)
 La professoressa di scienze naturali (1976)
 La dottoressa sotto il lenzuolo (1976)
 Il marito in collegio (1977)
 Taxi Girl (1977)
 Sesso e volentieri (1982)
 S.P.Q.R.: 2,000 and a Half Years Ago (1994)

References

External links 
 
 

1926 births
1999 deaths
People from Certaldo
20th-century Italian male actors
Italian male film actors
Italian male voice actors
Italian male television actors
Italian male stage actors